Nader al-Masri (born January 26, 1980) is a Palestinian Olympic athlete from Beit Hanoun in the Gaza Strip. He participated in the 5,000-metre race at the 2008 Olympics in Beijing, China.  He was the only person from the Gaza Strip and one of the only four Palestinians who participated in the Olympics in 2008. For several months, Israel refused his request to pass through Israel to train elsewhere; Israeli officials subsequently granted him a permit in April 2008.
He finished in 39th place 47. In 2015 he won the Palestine Marathon after runners from Gaza were permitted by Israel to attend the event for the first (and so far only) time.

References

External links
 "Nader al Masri", n°32 on Time’s list of "100 Olympic Athletes To Watch"
 
 
 

1980 births
Living people
People from North Gaza Governorate
Palestinian male long-distance runners
Athletes (track and field) at the 2008 Summer Olympics
Olympic athletes of Palestine
Athletes (track and field) at the 2002 Asian Games
Athletes (track and field) at the 2006 Asian Games
Athletes (track and field) at the 2010 Asian Games
Palestinian male marathon runners
Asian Games competitors for Palestine
Palestinian male cross country runners